HMS Exe was a River-class destroyer ordered by the Royal Navy under the 1901–1902 Naval Estimates. Named after the River Exe in southern England flowing through Exeter in the County of Devon, she was the first ship to carry this name in the Royal Navy. She served on the China Station before World War I and in the North Sea during the war. She was sold in 1920.

Construction
She was laid down on 14 July 1902 at the Palmer’s shipyard at Jarrow and launched on 27 April 1903.  She was completed in March 1904.  Her original armament was to be the same as the turtleback torpedo boat destroyers that preceded her. In 1906 the Admiralty decided to upgrade the armament by landing the five QF 6-pounder (8 cwt) guns and shipping three QF 12-pounder 8 cwt guns.  Two would be mounted abeam at the forecastle break and the third gun would be mounted on the quarterdeck.

Pre-war
After commissioning she was assigned to the China Station in late 1904.  In September 1905 Exe under the command of Commander Alan Everett, while accompanying  encountered a severe typhoon between Wei-hai-wei and Shanghai.  Both ships weathered the storm and proved the seaworthiness of the River class design.

On 30 August 1912 the Admiralty directed all destroyer classes were to be designated by alpha characters starting with the letter 'A'.  The ships of the River class were assigned to the E class.  After 30 September 1913, she was known as an E-class destroyer and had the letter ‘E’ painted on the hull below the bridge area and on either the fore or aft funnel.

In September 1912 Exe completed a refit at Sheerness Dockyard and rejoined the Fifth Flotilla. In March 1913, Exe formed part of the Ninth Flotilla based at Chatham, one of four Flotillas equipped with old destroyers and torpedo boats for patrol purposes.

World War I
The 9th Flotilla was a patrol flotilla tasked with anti-submarine and counter mining patrols in the Firth of Forth area. Her duties here included counter-mining patrols and antisubmarine measures in defence of the Fleet anchorage.

Exe was still based at Scapa in January 1915, but in February, it was decided to base more destroyers in the English Channel to protect troop transports, and Exe was ordered to join the Sixth Flotilla, part of the Dover Patrol, leaving Scapa on 27 February and arriving at Dover on 2 March. At the end of March, she moved again, being one of eight River-class destroyers transferred to Portsmouth for escort operations, relieving the s from their escort duties so the Beagles could be detached to the Mediterranean for use in the Dardanelles Campaign.

On 15 December 1916 Exe and sister ship  were mid-English Channel, returning from escorting a convoy to Le Havre when they interrupted the German submarine , which had stopped the British steamer Red Rose. UC-17 dived on sighting the smoke from the destroyers, saving Red Rose from being sunk. Exe attempted to search for the submarine, deploying an explosive paravane, which exploded when lowered, but UC-17 was unharmed. On 27 February 1917 Exe spotted the German submarine  in the Channel. Exe attacked with explosive paravanes while the P-class patrol boat  attacked with depth charges, but the submarine was undamaged. On the night of 13/14 May Exe was escorting the merchant ship  between Portsmouth and Le Havre when her commanding officer spotted a possible submarine. Exe attempted to ram the submarine, which disappeared in a rain storm without being hit.

Fate
In 1919 she was paid off and laid up in reserve awaiting disposal. On 10 February 1920 she was sold to Thos. W. Ward of Sheffield for breaking at Rainham, Kent, on the Thames Estuary.

Pennant numbers

Notes

Citations

Bibliography

 

 

River-class destroyers
1903 ships